Diyarbakırspor is a Turkish professional football club located in the city of Diyarbakır. Formed in 1968, they are nicknamed Diyar ("land"). Their colours are red and green, and they play their home matches at Diyarbakır Stadium.

Diyarbakırspor are the second club in the world to earn double promotion (after Nottingham Forest). Domestically, they have finished runners-up for the 1.Lig (Second Division) once, in 1976–77, and in third place twice, for 1980–81 and 1985–86.

History 
Diyarbakırspor was formed after the merger of Diclespor and Yıldızspor on 24 June 1968. Their club colours were red and green; red for Yıldızspor, green for Diclespor. Nejat Cemiloğlu was the first president of the club. The club competed in the 2.Lig from 1968 to 1975.

Under the guidance of president Ali Kahraman and vice-president Şeyhmus Akçadağ, Diyarbakırspor earned double promotion to the 1.Lig in 1976 and 1977. Diyarbakirspor were the first Turkish club to achieve the feat of double promotion, and second in the world, behind Nottingham Forest.

In the second season of top-flight football, Diyarbakırspor spent five weeks at the top of the table. However, they finished in fifth place at the end of the season. They also qualified for the Balkans Cup. Diyarbakırspor were relegated for the first time in 1980, earned promotion back to the top-flight the following season, and were relegated once more the next season. They spent three years in the 2.Lig before winning promotion to the 1.Lig.

At the end of the 1986–87 season, Diyarbakırspor finished with a record for lowest points in the 1. Lig with 11. The club would compete in the 2. Lig until 2001 before earning promotion back to the Süper Lig. Diyarbakırspor spent 5 years in Super League after relegation in 2006. Diyarbakırspor finally played top level in 2008–2009 season.

What is left from the team has been reorganised and is playing at the Diyarbakır Amateur Leagues under the name Diyarbakır 1968 SK.

In 2010, another club was reestablished as Yeni Diyarbakırspor, competing in the Turkish Regional Amateur League until 2013, when they managed to secure promotion to the TFF Third League. In 2015, the team adopted Diyarbekirspor A.Ş. as their new name.

Colours and badge 
The club colours are red and green. They were the colours of the two clubs who merged to make up Diyarbakırspor, Yıldızspor (red) and Diclespor (green). The badge features the city walls of Diyarbakır. The city is home to the world's second largest walled structure, trailing behind the Great Wall of China. The badge also features a watermelon, a symbol of the city.

Stadium 
Diyarbakırspor play their home matches at Diyarbakır Atatürk Stadium, a multi-purpose stadium located in the city of Diyarbakır. The field measures 68 meters by 105 meters with working floodlights. The capacity is 12,963 seats. On 15 May 2018, the new Diyarbakır Stadium with a capacity of 33,000 seats, was inaugurated with a match between Diyarbakırspor and Tire 1922 SK.

Honours 
TFF First League
Winners  (3): 1976–1977, 1980-1981, 1985-1986
Second place (2): 2000-2001, 2008-2009

TFF Third League (2) 1975-1976, 2012-2013

Turkish Cup
Semi final (1) 1981-1982
Quarter final (3) 1978-1979, 1980-1981, 2004–2005

League affiliations 
Süper Lig 1977-1980, 1981-1982,1986-1987, 2001-2006, 2009-2010

TFF First League 1976-1977, 1980-1981, 1982-1986, 1987-2001, 2006-2009, 2010–2011

TFF Second League 1968-1976, 2011-2012

TFF Third League 2012-2013

Turkish Regional Amateur League 2013-2014, 2020-

References

External links 
Official website
Diyarbakırspor on TFF.org

 
Association football clubs established in 1968
Football clubs in Turkey
1968 establishments in Turkey
Süper Lig clubs
Sport in Diyarbakır